Magnolia Grove is a historic plantation house located near Iron Station, Lincoln County, North Carolina.  It was built about 1824, and is a -story, five bay by two bay, style brick dwelling with a Quaker plan interior.  It has a gable roof, sits on a full raised basement, and one-story hip-roof porches on the front and rear facades.

It was listed on the National Register of Historic Places in 1972, with a boundary increase in 1997.

References 

Plantation houses in North Carolina
Houses on the National Register of Historic Places in North Carolina
Houses completed in 1824
Houses in Lincoln County, North Carolina
National Register of Historic Places in Lincoln County, North Carolina